Chiapas Zoque is a dialect cluster of Zoquean languages indigenous to southern Mexico (Wichmann 1995). The three varieties with ISO codes, Francisco León (about 20,000 speakers in 1990), Copainalá (about 10,000), and Rayón (about 2,000), are named after the towns they are spoken in, though residents of Francisco León were relocated after their town was buried in the eruption of El Chichón Volcano in 1982. Francisco León and Copainalá are 83% mutually intelligible according to Ethnologue.

Classification
The following classification of Chiapas Zoque dialects is from.

Chiapas Zoque
North: Francisco León, Ostuacán
Northeast: Rayón, Pantepec, Tapilula,  Tapalapa, Ocotepec, Chapultenango, Amatán, Tapijulapa, Oxolotán
Central: Copainalá, Tecpatán, Coapilla
South: Tuxtla Gutiérrez (Copoya), Berriozabal, San Fernando, Ocozocuautla

Another language, Jitotolteco, was announced in 2011. Jitotoltec is a recently discovered language belonging to the Zoquean branch of the Mixe-Zoquean language family spoken in Chiapas. It is not a dialect of Chiapas Zoque.

Current situation
There are about 15,000 speakers of Chiapas Zoque, although the number is rapidly decreasing (Faarlund 2012:3). The vast majority of speakers reside in Tapalapa, Ocotepec, and Pantepec. 80%–90% of the population in Tapalapa and Ocotepec (combined population: about 10,000) are speakers of Zoque (Faarlund 2012). 50% of the population in Pantepec (pop. 8,000) are Zoque speakers.

Before the publication of Jan Terje Faarlund's A Grammar of Chiapas Zoque (2012), the best documented Chiapas Zoque variety has been that of Copainalá due to the work of William Wonderly and other scholars. More detailed work has been done on Gulf Zoque and Oaxaca Zoque languages. Chiapas Zoque is an endangered language due to rapid language shift to Spanish among Zoque youths, although this is mitigated by the Zoque people's attempts to preserve their culture and language (Faarlund 2012:3).

Phonology 

The liquids /l, r/ mostly occur in Spanish loanwords.

Lexical comparison 
The following table shows how numerals in two of the principal varieties of Chiapas Zoque compare to the numerals of proto-Zoque.

References

 Faarlund, Jan Terje. 2012. A Grammar of Chiapas Zoque. Oxford: Oxford University Press.
 Wichmann, Søren, 1995. The Relationship Among the Mixe–Zoquean Languages of Mexico. University of Utah Press. Salt Lake City.

External links

Copainalá Zoque 

OLAC resources in and about the Copainalá Zoque language

Francisco León Zoque 

OLAC resources in and about the Francisco León Zoque language

Rayón Zoque 

OLAC resources in and about the Rayón Zoque language

Indigenous languages of Mexico
Mesoamerican languages
Mixe–Zoque languages